Psych' Swag: Da Horror Movie is the eighth studio album by Horrorcore rapper Ganxsta N.I.P and was released in 2010. It is his second album to be released on his independent record label 'Psych Ward Entertainment'. The album consists of 14 songs. It has no guests appeared on the album.

Track list
 "N.I.P. Is Coming" 3:33
 "Rick Ross'n" 5:04
 "Back From Da Grave" 4:11
 "Once Upon A Time" 4:14
 "Hustle Man" 3:43
 "If Da Bullets Could Talk" 3:09
 "Keep It Ganxsta" 3:26
 "Psych Swag" 3:17
 "Mail Man (Recession)" 3:17
 "Strip Club" 3:36
 "Don’t Be Scared" 3:25
 "Da Reaper Is Back" 3:49 	
 "F*ck You Haters" 3:51
 "I'm A Psycho"  4:42

Personnel

Samples
 Rick Ross’n
 Hustlin' by Rick Ross

External links
 emusic.com
 [ Psych Swag] at allmusic

2009 albums
Ganksta N-I-P albums
Horrorcore albums